Tylototriton panhai is a newt found in Thailand and Laos. It was recently distinguished from Tylototriton shanjing (emperor newt) by Nishikawa et al., 2013.

The specific name, panhai, is in honour of Somsak Panha of Department of Biology, Chulalongkorn University for his dedication to the study of small new living organisms in the world for a long time, mostly discovered in Thailand.

Distribution
Tylototriton panhai is found in:
Phu Hin Rong Kla National Park, Phitsanulok Province, Thailand
Phu Luang Wildlife Sanctuary and Phu Suan Sai National Park, Loei Province, Thailand
Sayaboury Province, Laos

References

Nishikawa, Kanto, Wichase Khonsue, Porrawee Pomchote and Masafumi Matsui. 2013. Two New Species of Tylototriton from Thailand (Amphibia: Urodela: Salamandridae). Zootaxa. 3737(3): 261–279.
http://novataxa.blogspot.com/2013/11/tylototriton-uyenoi-et-panhai.html
http://amphibiaweb.org/cgi/amphib_query?where-genus=Tylototriton&where-species=panhai

External links

panhai
Amphibians of Thailand